Cristinești is a commune in Botoșani County, Western Moldavia, Romania. It is composed of six villages: Baranca, Cristinești, Dămileni, Dragalina, Fundu Herții and Poiana.

References

Communes in Botoșani County
Localities in Western Moldavia